Stanley Island is a  long and 520 m high island off Heros Peninsula on Foyn Coast, Antarctica.

The island was charted by the FIDS in 1947 and named for Rt. Hon. Oliver F.G. Stanley, M.P., Secretary of State for the British Colonies, who played an important part in establishing the survey. This island was photographed from the air during 1947 by the Ronne Antarctic Research Expedition under Finn Ronne.

References 
Stanley Island. SCAR Composite Antarctic Gazetteer

Islands of Graham Land
Foyn Coast